The byte is a unit of digital information that most commonly consists of eight bits. Historically, the byte was the number of bits used to encode a single character of text in a computer and for this reason it is the smallest addressable unit of memory in many computer architectures. To disambiguate arbitrarily sized bytes from the common 8-bit definition, network protocol documents such as the Internet Protocol refer to an 8-bit byte as an octet. Those bits in an octet are usually counted with numbering from 0 to 7 or 7 to 0 depending on the bit endianness. The first bit is number 0, making the eighth bit number 7.

The size of the byte has historically been hardware-dependent and no definitive standards existed that mandated the size. Sizes from 1 to 48 bits have been used. The six-bit character code was an often-used implementation in early encoding systems, and computers using six-bit and nine-bit bytes were common in the 1960s. These systems often had memory words of 12, 18, 24, 30, 36, 48, or 60 bits, corresponding to 2, 3, 4, 5, 6, 8, or 10 six-bit bytes. In this era, bit groupings in the instruction stream were often referred to as syllables or slab, before the term byte became common.

The modern de facto standard of eight bits, as documented in ISO/IEC 2382-1:1993, is a convenient power of two permitting the binary-encoded values 0 through 255 for one byte—2 to the power of 8 is 256. The international standard IEC 80000-13 codified this common meaning. Many types of applications use information representable in eight or fewer bits and processor designers commonly optimize for this usage. The popularity of major commercial computing architectures has aided in the ubiquitous acceptance of the 8-bit byte. Modern architectures typically use 32- or 64-bit words, built of four or eight bytes, respectively.

The unit symbol for the byte was designated as the upper-case letter B by the International Electrotechnical Commission (IEC) and Institute of Electrical and Electronics Engineers (IEEE). Internationally, the unit octet, symbol o, explicitly defines a sequence of eight bits, eliminating the potential ambiguity of the term "byte".

Etymology and history
The term byte was coined by Werner Buchholz in June 1956, during the early design phase for the IBM Stretch computer, which had addressing to the bit and variable field length (VFL) instructions with a byte size encoded in the instruction.
It is a deliberate respelling of bite to avoid accidental mutation to bit.

Another origin of byte for bit groups smaller than a computer's word size, and in particular groups of four bits, is on record by Louis G. Dooley, who claimed he coined the term while working with Jules Schwartz and Dick Beeler on an air defense system called SAGE at MIT Lincoln Laboratory in 1956 or 1957, which was jointly developed by Rand, MIT, and IBM. Later on, Schwartz's language JOVIAL actually used the term, but the author recalled vaguely that it was derived from AN/FSQ-31.

Early computers used a variety of four-bit binary-coded decimal (BCD) representations and the six-bit codes for printable graphic patterns common in the U.S. Army (FIELDATA) and Navy. These representations included alphanumeric characters and special graphical symbols. These sets were expanded in 1963 to seven bits of coding, called the American Standard Code for Information Interchange (ASCII) as the Federal Information Processing Standard, which replaced the incompatible teleprinter codes in use by different branches of the U.S. government and universities during the 1960s. ASCII included the distinction of upper- and lowercase alphabets and a set of control characters to facilitate the transmission of written language as well as printing device functions, such as page advance and line feed, and the physical or logical control of data flow over the transmission media. During the early 1960s, while also active in ASCII standardization, IBM simultaneously introduced in its product line of System/360 the eight-bit Extended Binary Coded Decimal Interchange Code (EBCDIC), an expansion of their six-bit binary-coded decimal (BCDIC) representations used in earlier card punches.
The prominence of the System/360 led to the ubiquitous adoption of the eight-bit storage size, while in detail the EBCDIC and ASCII encoding schemes are different.

In the early 1960s, AT&T introduced digital telephony on long-distance trunk lines. These used the eight-bit μ-law encoding. This large investment promised to reduce transmission costs for eight-bit data.

The development of eight-bit microprocessors in the 1970s popularized this storage size. Microprocessors such as the Intel 8008, the direct predecessor of the 8080 and the 8086, used in early personal computers, could also perform a small number of operations on the four-bit pairs in a byte, such as the decimal-add-adjust (DAA) instruction. A four-bit quantity is often called a nibble, also nybble, which is conveniently represented by a single hexadecimal digit.

The term octet is used to unambiguously specify a size of eight bits. It is used extensively in protocol definitions.

Historically, the term octad or octade was used to denote eight bits as well at least in Western Europe; however, this usage is no longer common. The exact origin of the term is unclear, but it can be found in British, Dutch, and German sources of the 1960s and 1970s, and throughout the documentation of Philips mainframe computers.

Unit symbol
The unit symbol for the byte is specified in IEC 80000-13, IEEE 1541 and the Metric Interchange Format as the upper-case character B.

In the International System of Quantities (ISQ), B is the symbol of the bel, a unit of logarithmic power ratio named after Alexander Graham Bell, creating a conflict with the IEC specification. However, little danger of confusion exists, because the bel is a rarely used unit. It is used primarily in its decadic fraction, the decibel (dB), for signal strength and sound pressure level measurements, while a unit for one-tenth of a byte, the decibyte, and other fractions, are only used in derived units, such as transmission rates.

The lowercase letter o for octet is defined as the symbol for octet in IEC 80000-13 and is commonly used in languages such as French and Romanian, and is also combined with metric prefixes for multiples, for example ko and Mo.

Multiple-byte units

More than one system exists to define larger units based on the byte. Some systems are based on powers of 10; other systems are based on powers of 2. Nomenclature for these systems has been the subject of confusion. Systems based on powers of 10 reliably use standard SI prefixes (kilo, mega, giga, ...) and their corresponding symbols (k, M, G, ...). Systems based on powers of 2, however, might use binary prefixes (kibi, mebi, gibi, ...) and their corresponding symbols (Ki, Mi, Gi, ...) or they might use the prefixes K, M, and G, creating ambiguity when the prefixes M or G are used.

While the numerical difference between the decimal and binary interpretations is relatively small for the kilobyte (about 2% smaller than the kibibyte), the systems deviate increasingly as units grow larger (the relative deviation grows by 2.4% for each three orders of magnitude). For example, a power-of-10-based yottabyte is about 17% smaller than power-of-2-based yobibyte.

Units based on powers of 10
Definition of prefixes using powers of 10—in which 1 kilobyte (symbol kB) is defined to equal 1,000 bytes—is recommended by the International Electrotechnical Commission (IEC). The IEC standard defines eight such multiples, up to 1 yottabyte (YB), equal to 10008 bytes. The additional prefixes ronna- for 10009 and quetta- for 100010 were adopted by the International Bureau of Weights and Measures (BIPM) in 2022.

This definition is most commonly used for data-rate units in computer networks, internal bus, hard drive and flash media transfer speeds, and for the capacities of most storage media, particularly hard drives, flash-based storage, and DVDs. Operating systems that use this definition include macOS, iOS, Ubuntu, and Debian. It is also consistent with the other uses of the SI prefixes in computing, such as CPU clock speeds or measures of performance.

Units based on powers of 2
A system of units based on powers of 2 in which 1 kibibyte (KiB) is equal to 1,024 (i.e., 210) bytes is defined by international standard IEC 80000-13 and is supported by national and international standards bodies (BIPM, IEC, NIST). The IEC standard defines eight such multiples, up to 1 yobibyte (YiB), equal to 10248 bytes. The natural binary counterparts to ronna- and quetta- were given in a consultation paper of the International Committee for Weights and Measures' Consultative Committee for Units (CCU) as robi- (Ri, 10249) and quebi- (Qi, 102410), but they have not yet been adopted by the IEC and ISO.

An alternate system of nomenclature for the same units (referred to here as the customary convention), in which 1 kilobyte (KB) is equal to 1,024 bytes, 1 megabyte (MB) is equal to 10242 bytes and  1 gigabyte (GB) is equal to 10243 bytes is mentioned by a 1990s JEDEC standard. Only the first three multiples (up to GB) are mentioned by the JEDEC standard, which makes no mention of TB and larger. The customary convention is used by the Microsoft Windows operating system and random-access memory capacity, such as main memory and CPU cache size, and in marketing and billing by telecommunication companies, such as Vodafone, AT&T, Orange and Telstra.

This definition was used by Apple Inc. operating systems prior to Mac OS X 10.6 Snow Leopard and iOS 10 before switching to units based on powers of 10.

Parochial units 

Various computer vendors have coined terms for data of various sizes, sometimes with different sizes for the same term even within a single vendor. These terms include double word, half word, long word, quad word, slab, superword and syllable.

History of the conflicting definitions

Contemporary computer memory has a binary architecture making a definition of memory units based on powers of 2 most practical. The use of the metric prefix kilo for binary multiples arose as a convenience, because 1,024 is approximately 1,000. This definition was popular in early decades of personal computing, with products like the Tandon 5-inch DD floppy format (holding 368,640 bytes) being advertised as "360 KB", following the 1,024-byte convention. It was not universal, however. The Shugart SA-400 5-inch floppy disk held 109,375 bytes unformatted, and was advertised as "110 Kbyte", using the 1000 convention. Likewise, the 8-inch DEC RX01 floppy (1975) held 256,256 bytes formatted, and was advertised as "256k". Other disks were advertised using a mixture of the two definitions: notably, -inch HD disks advertised as "1.44 MB" in fact have a capacity of 1,440 KiB, the equivalent of 1.47 MB or 1.41 MiB.

In 1995, the International Union of Pure and Applied Chemistry's (IUPAC) Interdivisional Committee on Nomenclature and Symbols attempted to resolve this ambiguity by proposing a set of binary prefixes for the powers of 1024, including kibi (kilobinary), mebi (megabinary), and gibi (gigabinary).

In December 1998, the IEC addressed such multiple usages and definitions by adopting the IUPAC's proposed prefixes (kibi, mebi, gibi, etc.) to unambiguously denote powers of 1024. Thus one kibibyte (1 KiB) is 10241  bytes = 1024 bytes, one mebibyte (1 MiB) is 10242  bytes =  bytes, and so on.

In 1999, Donald Knuth suggested calling the kibibyte a "large kilobyte" (KKB).

Modern standard definitions
The IEC adopted the IUPAC proposal and published the standard in January 1999. The IEC prefixes are now part of the International System of Quantities. The IEC further specified that the kilobyte should only be used to refer to 1,000 bytes.

Lawsuits over definition
Lawsuits arising from alleged consumer confusion over the binary and decimal definitions of multiples of the byte have generally ended in favor of the manufacturers, with courts holding that the legal definition of gigabyte or GB is 1 GB = 1,000,000,000 (109) bytes (the decimal definition), rather than the binary definition (230). Specifically, the United States District Court for the Northern District of California held that "the U.S. Congress has deemed the decimal definition of gigabyte to be the 'preferred' one for the purposes of 'U.S. trade and commerce' [...] The California Legislature has likewise adopted the decimal system for all 'transactions in this state.'"

Earlier lawsuits had ended in settlement with no court ruling on the question, such as a lawsuit against drive manufacturer Western Digital. Western Digital settled the challenge and added explicit disclaimers to products that the usable capacity may differ from the advertised capacity. Seagate was sued on similar grounds and also settled.

Practical examples

Common uses
Many programming languages define the data type byte.

The C and C++ programming languages define byte as an "addressable unit of data storage large enough to hold any member of the basic character set of the execution environment" (clause 3.6 of the C standard). The C standard requires that the integral data type unsigned char must hold at least 256 different values, and is represented by at least eight bits (clause 5.2.4.2.1). Various implementations of C and C++ reserve 8, 9, 16, 32, or 36 bits for the storage of a byte. In addition, the C and C++ standards require that there are no gaps between two bytes. This means every bit in memory is part of a byte.

Java's primitive data type byte is defined as eight bits. It is a signed data type, holding values from −128 to 127.

.NET programming languages, such as C#, define byte as an unsigned type, and the sbyte as a signed data type, holding values from 0 to 255, and −128 to 127, respectively.

In data transmission systems, the byte is used as a contiguous sequence of bits in a serial data stream, representing the smallest distinguished unit of data. A transmission unit might additionally include start bits, stop bits, and parity bits, and thus its size may vary from seven to twelve bits to contain a single seven-bit ASCII code.

See also
 Data
 Data hierarchy
 Nibble
 Octet (computing)
 Primitive data type
 Tryte
 Word (computer architecture)

Notes

References

Further reading
 
 Ashley Taylor. “Bits and Bytes.” Stanford. https://web.stanford.edu/class/cs101/bits-bytes.html

Data types
Units of information
Binary arithmetic
Computer memory
Data unit
Primitive types
1950s neologisms
8 (number)